The Department of Transport, Planning and Local Infrastructure (DTPLI) was a department of the Government of Victoria. It was created in machinery of government changes in 2013 following Denis Napthine's appointment as premier, and was abolished in 2015 following the election of a new government led by Daniel Andrews. The department had responsibility for policies relating to transport, planning, local government and sport, and oversaw a variety of other agencies in those functions.

History 
Following the resignation of Ted Ballieu as Premier on 6 May 2013, Denis Napthine was elected leader of the parliamentary Liberal Party and sworn in as Premier in the following days. On 9 April, Napthine announced extensive machinery of government changes, reducing the number of departments from 11 to 9. The Department of Transport and Department of Planning and Community Development were merged, creating DTPLI, which also assumed responsibility for land use from the Department of Sustainability and Environment, and minor functions from other departments. Dean Yates, a deputy secretary of the Department of Premier and Cabinet, was appointed secretary, and former Transport secretary Jim Betts' contract was not renewed.

Following the election of the Labor Party under Daniel Andrews at the November 2014 election, DTPLI was abolished on 1 January 2015 in changes which further reduced the number of departments from 9 to 7. The functions of DTPLI were absorbed by the newly created Department of Economic Development, Jobs, Transport and Resources, Department of Environment, Land, Water and Planning, and Department of Health and Human Services.

References 

Transport, Planning and Local Infrastructure
Ministries established in 2013
2013 establishments in Australia
Ministries disestablished in 2015
2015 disestablishments in Australia